Pascual Fresquet Llopis (Alcalà de Xivert, 1907–1957) was a Valencian libertarian communist and the leader of the Death Brigade.

Biography
Pascual Fresquet Llopis was born in 1907 in Alcalà de Xivert. As a child his family emigrated to La Torrassa, in L'Hospitalet de Llobregat district, which was made up of a working population that was mostly affiliated with the CNT. His parents worked on the Barcelona Metro and his mother, Purificación Llopis, ran an inn on Carrer Sugranyes. Fresquet was the president of the CNT construction union in the Sants neighborhood in 1936.

With the outbreak of the war, he came to command the Brigade of Death, a unit linked to the FAI that was responsible for more than 200 murders between July and September 1936.

References

Bibliography
 
 

1907 births
1957 deaths
People from Baix Maestrat
Confederación Nacional del Trabajo members
Spanish anarchists
Spanish military personnel of the Spanish Civil War (Republican faction)
Spanish exiles
People from L'Hospitalet de Llobregat